The 2010 Lehigh Mountain Hawks football team represented Lehigh University in the 2010 NCAA Division I FCS football season. The team was led by fifth-year head coach Andy Coen and played its home games at Goodman Stadium. They finished the regular season with a 9–2 record overall and a 5–0 record in Patriot League play, making them conference champions. The team qualified for the playoffs, in which they were eliminated in the second round by Delaware.

Schedule

References

Lehigh
Lehigh Mountain Hawks football seasons
Patriot League football champion seasons
Lehigh
Lehigh Mountain Hawks football